The  Commander United Kingdom Carrier Strike Group, (COMUKCSG)  is a senior British Royal Navy appointment which commands the UK Carrier Strike Group. COMUKCSG, a Commodore, commands a total of 65 personnel, and is headquartered at HMNB Portsmouth.

History
The post holder was first established in 2006 as Commander, United Kingdom Carrier Task Group it was later re-designated UK Carrier Strike Group. 

Commodore Cunningham, the previous COMUKCSG, flew his flag throughout the January to May Orion '08 deployment, as Commander Task Group 328.01, which included exercises with the Indian Navy, aboard .

The appointment of Commander UK Carrier Strike Group was disestablished in January 2011, following the 2010 Strategic Defence and Security Review. The post was re-established in February 2015.

List of Commanders Carrier Strike Group (first iteration)
 Commodore Alan D. Richards: 2006-July 2007
 Commodore Thomas A. Cunningham: July 2007-April 2009 
 Commodore Simon J. Ancona: April 2009-January 2011

List of Commanders UK Carrier Strike Group (second iteration)
 Commodore Jeremy P. Kyd: February 2015-September 2016 
 Commodore Andrew Betton: September 2016-October 2018
 Commodore Michael D. Utley: October 2018-December 2019 
 Commodore Stephen M.R. Moorhouse: December 2019-January 2022
 Commodore Angus Essenhigh: January 2022-present

See also
 Royal Navy Surface Fleet
 Queen Elizabeth-class aircraft carrier
 Commander United Kingdom Strike Force
 Commander Littoral Strike Group

References

U
Military units and formations established in 2006